Back 2 the Future is a compilation album by Cosmic Gate that includes remixes of some of their older songs, such as Fire Wire, Exploration of Space, Human Beings and The Drums. The tracks were remixed by other well-established DJs, such as Dimitri Vegas & Like Mike, John O'Callaghan, Markus Schulz, Arnej and others. It was released on February 22, 2011.

Track listing 
Disc 1
 Exploration of Space (Cosmic Gate's Back 2 the Future Remix)
 Fire Wire (Cosmic Gate's Back 2 The Future Remix)
 Raging (Duderstadt Remix)
 Back to Earth (Jochen Miller Remix)
 Human Beings (Estiva Remix)
 The Truth (Cold Blue Remix) 
 Fire Wire (Rank 1 Remix)
 The Drums (Markus Schulz Remix) 
 Melt to the Ocean (John O'Callaghan's Main Room Remix)

Disc 2
 Back to Earth (Arty Remix)
 Fire Wire (Wippenberg Remix)
 Raging (Alexander Popov Remix) 
 Exploration of Space (Spencer & Hill Remix) 
 The Drums (Robbie Rivera Juicy Mofo Remix)
 Fire Wire (DJ Delicious ReWire Fire Mix)
 Human Beings (Daniel Kandi's Human Society Remix) 
 Exploration of Space (Dirty Herz Rave-O-Lution Remix)
 Fire Wire (Dimitri Vegas & Like Mike Remix)
 Human Beings (Arnej Remix)

References

Cosmic Gate albums
2011 compilation albums